The Medway River is an  tidal river in the U.S. state of Georgia. It is formed by the confluence of the Laurel View River with the smaller Belfast and Tivoli rivers, all three of which are tidal. It empties into St. Catherines Sound, an arm of the Atlantic Ocean.  The Medway River for nearly its entire length serves as the boundary between Bryan and Liberty counties, with Chatham County joining on the north side at the river's mouth.

See also
List of rivers of Georgia

References 

Rivers of Georgia (U.S. state)
Rivers of Bryan County, Georgia
Rivers of Liberty County, Georgia
Rivers of Chatham County, Georgia